Rison School District was a school district headquartered in Rison, Arkansas. It operated Rison Elementary School and Rison High School. Its mascot was the wildcat.

It included the community of Staves.

On July 1, 2004, it consolidated with the Kingsland School District to form the Cleveland County School District.

References

External links
 

Education in Cleveland County, Arkansas
Defunct school districts in Arkansas
2004 disestablishments in Arkansas
School districts disestablished in 2004